USS Mundelta (ID-1301) was a cargo ship that served in the United States Navy from 1918 to 1919.

Mundelta was built as the commercial cargo ship SS Mundelta in 1917 at Newport News, Virginia, by Newport News Shipbuilding and Drydock Company for the Munson Steamship Line of New York City. She was delivered to the Munson Steamship Line on 18 April 1918, but the U.S. Navy acquired her for World War I service from Munson on 20 April 1918. Assigned Identification Number (Id. No.) 1301, she was commissioned at New York City on 20 April 1918 or 27 April 1918 as USS Mundelta.

Assigned to the Naval Overseas Transportation Service, Mundelta departed New York City in convoy on 8 May 1918, docking at Le Havre, France, on 20 May 1918 to debark United States Army supplies. On 20 June 1918 she steamed for New York. At New York she loaded mixed cargo for the first of three transatlantic voyages to Bordeaux, France, the last of which she completed at New York on 26 December 1918. In January 1919 she took a load of coal from Norfolk, Virginia, to Havana, Cuba. She then moved to Mobile, Alabama, and finally to New Orleans, Louisiana.

At New Orleans on 11 February 1919, Mundelta simultaneously was decommissioned, transferred to the United States Shipping Board, and returned to the Munson Steamship Line.

Once again SS Mundelta, she operated for the Munson Steamship Line in commercial service until 1937, when she was sold to a British firm at Shanghai, China, and renamed SS Munlock. Seized by Japan in China at the beginning of World War II in December 1941, she was placed in Japanese service as Rizan Maru. The U.S. Navy submarine USS Searaven (SS-196) torpedoed and sank Rizan Maru in the North Pacific Ocean on 21 September 1944.

Notes

References

Department of the Navy: Naval Historical Center Online Library of Selected Images:  Civilian Ships: S.S. Mundelta (American Freighter, 1917) Served as USS Mundelta (ID # 1301) in 1918–1919. Later S.S. Munlock and Rizan Maru.
NavSource Online: Section Patrol Craft Photo Archive: Mundelta (ID 1301)

World War I cargo ships of the United States
Ships built in Newport News, Virginia
1917 ships
Mundelta-class cargo ships